These are the official results of the Women's 1,500 metres event at the 1994 European Championships in Helsinki, Finland, held at Helsinki Olympic Stadium on 12 and 14 August 1994.

Medalists

Results

Final
14 August

Heats
12 August

Heat 1

Heat 2

Participation
According to an unofficial count, 24 athletes from 15 countries participated in the event.

 (1)
 (1)
 (1)
 (3)
 (2)
 (2)
 (1)
 (2)
 (1)
 (1)
 (3)
 (1)
 (1)
 (1)
 (3)

See also
 1990 Women's European Championships 1,500 metres (Split)
 1991 Women's World Championships 1,500 metres (Tokyo)
 1992 Women's Olympic 1,500 metres (Barcelona)
 1993 Women's World Championships 1,500 metres (Stuttgart)
 1995 Women's World Championships 1,500 metres (Gothenburg)
 1996 Women's Olympic 1,500 metres (Atlanta)
 1997 Women's World Championships 1,500 metres (Athens)
 1998 Women's European Championships 1,500 metres (Budapest)

References

 Results

1500
1500 metres at the European Athletics Championships
1994 in women's athletics